Paul Affleck (born 25 June 1966) is a Welsh professional golfer who has played on the European Tour.

Affleck was born in St Asaph. He turned pro in 1986. He visited qualifying school four times before he finally got his European Tour card after winning the Challenge Tour in 1992. He won the 1992 Audi Open on the Challenge Tour. He had to go back to qualifying school but he regained his card. He held onto it until 2000 where he finished 141st on the Order of Merit.

Affleck lives in Chester, England.

Professional wins (1)

Challenge Tour wins (1)

Results in major championships

Note: Affleck only played in The Open Championship.

CUT = missed the half-way cut
"T" = tied

Team appearances
Alfred Dunhill Cup (representing Wales): 1995, 1996

References

External links

Welsh male golfers
European Tour golfers
Sportspeople from St Asaph
Sportspeople from Chester
1966 births
Living people